Straume may refer to:

People
Straume (surname)

Places

Latvia
Straume, Latvia, a village in Jelgava county

Norway
Straume, Bergen, a village in Bergen municipality in Vestland county
Straume, Gloppen, a village in Gloppen municipality in Vestland county
Straume, Nordland, a village in Bø municipality in Nordland county
Straume, Vaksdal, a village in Vaksdal municipality in Vestland county
Straume, Øygarden, a village in Øygarden municipality in Vestland county

See also
Straumen (disambiguation)